The following is a timeline of the history of Somerville, Massachusetts, USA.

Prior to 19th century
 1630 - Charlestown settled.
 1631 - Colonial Governor John Winthrop granted 600 acres of land known as Ten Hills Farm.
 1703 - Windmill built (approximate date).
 1714 - Peter Tufts House built.
 1756 - Powder House in use.
 1776 - Grand Union Flag raised at Continental Army fortifications atop Prospect Hill.

19th century

1800s–1860s
 1803 - Middlesex Canal begins in operation.
 1804 - Old Cemetery established.
 1821 - Middlesex Bleachery and Dye Works established.
 1834 - Ursuline Convent Riots.
 1835 - Boston & Lowell Railroad begins operating.
 1842
 Town of Somerville separates from Charlestown. 
 Population: 1,013.
 1844 - First Congregational Society formed.
 1851 - American Tube Works established.
 1852
 Somerville City Hall built.
 Somerville High School opens. 
 1853
 First Orthodox Congregational Church organized.
 First Universalist Society organized.
 1854
 Tufts College opens.
 Union Glass Company established.
 1856
 First Methodist Episcopal Church organized.
 Round House built.
 1863 - Broadway Orthodox Congregational Church organized.
 1864 - Circulating Library in business at Tufts' apothecary (approximate date).
 1866
 Emmanuel Episcopal Church built.
 Somerville Carriage Repository and Manufactory established.
 1867 - Perkins Street Baptist Church dedicated.
 1869 - Morse Grammar School built.

1870s–1890s
 1870
 Somerville Journal newspaper begins publication.
 St. Thomas Episcopal Church built.
 Boston and Lowell Railroad connected through West Somerville to the Lexington Branch.
 1871
 City incorporated. 
 Somerville Samaritan Society organized.
 1872
 Somerville city government inaugurated.
 City seal design adopted.
 Population: 16,000 (approximate).
 1873
 Public Library established.
 Luther V. Bell School built.
 Broadway Methodist Episcopal Church organized.
 1874
 West Somerville Baptist Church organized.
 West Somerville Congregational Church organized.
 Sprague & Hathaway Portrait Copying House established.
 1876 - Somerville Citizen newspaper begins publication.
 1886 - Third Universalist Church established.
 1890
 Broadway Winter Hill Congregational Church built.
 North Packing Company established.
 Population: 40,152.
 1891 - Somerville Hospital founded.
 1892 - McLean Hospital relocates to Belmont.
 1898
 Somerville Historical Society incorporated.
 Historic Festival.
 1899
 Forthian Club for women organized.
 First Unitarian Church built.
 1900 - Population: 61,643.

20th century
 1901 - Lyndell's Bakery relocates to Somerville.
 1903 - Prospect Hill Monument built.
 1909 - West Somerville Branch Public Library opens.
 1910 - Population: 77,236.
 1914
 Somerville Theatre built.
 Public Library central building constructed.
 Economy Grocery Store opens.
 1915 - Pageant of World Peace.
 1916 - First Universalist Church built.
 1922
 50th anniversary as city.
 Population: 95,000 (approximate).
 1928 - Northern Artery constructed.
 1935 - United States Post Office–Somerville Main built.
 1936 - Mystic Valley Parkway constructed.
 1941 - The Rosebud (diner) built.
 1968 - Havurat Shalom founded.
 1972 - City seal redesigned.
 1973 - Steve's Ice Cream opens.
 1980 - Assembly Square Mall opens.
 1981
 Sister city relationship established with Trincomalee, Sri Lanka.
 Bertucci's pizzeria opens.
 1983 - Somerville Community Access Television founded.
 1984 - Davis (MBTA station) opens.
 1985 - Alewife Linear Park established.
 1987
 Brickbottom Artists Association active.
 Mixit Print Studio established.
 Joseph P. Kennedy II becomes U.S. representative for Massachusetts's 8th congressional district.
 1988 - Somerville Museum opens.
 1990 - Mike Capuano becomes mayor.
 1991 - Candlewick Press established.
 1998 - City website online (approximate date).
 1999
 Dorothy Kelly Gay becomes mayor.
 Leverett Circle Connector Bridge opens.
 Somerville Open Studios begins.
Mike Capuano becomes U.S. representative for Massachusetts's 8th congressional district.

21st century

 2002 - P.A.'s Lounge opens.
 2003
 Won-Buddhist temple opens.
 GreenGoat in business.
 2004 - Joseph Curtatone becomes mayor.
 2005
 Union Square Main Streets organized.
 Union Square farmers' market begins.
 Sikh Sangat Society Boston and Harry Potter Alliance headquartered in Somerville.
 2006 - Honk! music festival begins.
 2007 - Highland Kitchen restaurant in business.
 2009 - Sister city relationship established with Tiznit, Morocco.
 2010
 Population: 75,754.
 Sister city relationship established with Nordeste, Portugal.
 2012 - Daddy Jones Bar opens in Magoun Square, owned by Somerville native, Dimitra Murphy
 2014 - Legoland in business.
 2022 - Katjana Ballantyne becomes mayor.

See also
 History of Somerville
 List of mayors of Somerville, Massachusetts
 National Register of Historic Places listings in Somerville, Massachusetts
 Charlestown, Massachusetts (from which Somerville sprang in 1842)
 Timelines of other municipalities in Middlesex County, Massachusetts: Cambridge, Lowell, Waltham

References

Bibliography

Further reading

External links

 
 Items related to Somerville, various dates (via Digital Public Library of America).
 View of Charlestown, Mass., as seen from Somerville. Gleason's Pictorial, c. 1850s.
Somerville's Civil War monuments at Massachusetts Civil War Monuments Project

Images

 
somerville